Alfredo Morabia (born 2 November 1952) is a Swiss-American physician, epidemiologist, and historian of medicine. He is currently professor of epidemiology at the Barry Commoner Center for Health and the Environment at Queens College, City University of New York in addition to serving as professor of Clinical Epidemiology at the Department of Epidemiology at the Mailman School of Public Health, Columbia University. 

Morabia serves as the editor-in-chief of the American Journal of Public Health. Morabia has also been editor of "Epidemiology in History" in the American Journal of Epidemiology. His expertise as a historian ranges from the history of scientific methods and concepts utilized to study population to urban health. He is the principal investigator of the World Trade Center-Heart cohort study, which delves into the long-term heart health of first responders from the 9/11, 2001 attack. He lectures and teaches on the history of epidemiology internationally in various languages.

Biography
Morabia completed his undergraduate studies at Collège Calvin in Geneva in 1971, majoring in Greek and Latin. After receiving his M.D. from the School of Medicine at the University of Geneva in 1978, he was trained in internal medicine at the University Hospital of Geneva and in occupational medicine in Italy. In 2009, he was appointed Fellow of the Royal College of Physicians of Edinburgh.

In 1986, Morabia received a grant from the Swiss National Science Foundation to study at the Johns Hopkins School of Hygiene and Public Health, where he obtained M.P.H. and Ph.D. degrees in epidemiology and an M.H.S. in biostatistics.

In August 1990, he became chair of the Clinical Epidemiology Unit at the University Hospital of Geneva. The unit grew into a division, and Morabia was subsequently appointed professor of clinical epidemiology at the University of Geneva. In 1992, he created the "Bus Santé 2000" (Health Bus 2000) which is still in operation 30 years later.

References

External links
"Cutter Symposium: Celebrating 100 Years (and more) of Epidemiology at Harvard" , video of a keynote lecture at Harvard School of Public Health, 8 November 2013
"Epi Seminar Series: How Epidemiology has become infatuated with methods?"

1952 births
20th-century American historians
20th-century Swiss historians
21st-century American historians
21st-century Swiss historians
American epidemiologists
American medical historians
American people of Swiss-Italian descent
American public health doctors
Columbia University faculty
Johns Hopkins University alumni
Living people
Medical journal editors
Queens College, City University of New York faculty
Swiss emigrants to the United States
Swiss epidemiologists
Swiss medical historians
Swiss public health doctors
University of Geneva alumni
Academic staff of the University of Geneva